The heavyweight was the heaviest freestyle wrestling weight class held as part of the Wrestling at the 1904 Summer Olympics programme. It was the first time the event, like all other freestyle wrestling events, was held in Olympic competition. It was held on Friday, October 14, 1904 and on Saturday, October 15, 1904. Five wrestlers competed.

Results

Fred Warmbold and William Hennessy were allowed to fight for the bronze medal as they both lost in this tournament against the gold medalist Bernhoff Hansen.

References

Sources
 

Wrestling at the 1904 Summer Olympics